Seksan is a Thai masculine first name and may refer to:

Seksan Chaothonglang (born 1983), Thai footballer
Seksan Piturat (born 1976), Thai footballer
Seksan Prasertkul (born 1949), a student leader of the October 1973 uprising in Thailand
Seksan Sukpimai (born 1974), (aka Sek Loso) the singer-guitarist of the Thai rock band Loso

Thai names